USS LST-689 was an  built for the United States Navy during World War II. Late in her career she was renamed Daggett County (LST-689)—after Daggett County, Utah, the only U.S. Naval vessel to bear the name—but never saw active service under that name.

LST-689 was laid down on 11 January 1944 at Jeffersonville, Indiana by the Jeffersonville Boat & Machine Company; launched on 9 March 1944; sponsored by Mrs. Edith C. Smith; and commissioned on 2 May 1944.

Service history
During World War II, LST-689 was assigned to the Asiatic-Pacific theater and participated in the Leyte landings in October in the capture and occupation of the southern Palau Islands in September and October, 1944 and the assault and occupation of Okinawa Gunto in April 1945. She was decommissioned on 26 November 1945 and struck from the Navy list on 5 December that same year. On 25 June 1946, the ship was sold to Arctic Circle Exploration, Inc., of Seattle, Washington.

The tank landing ship performed no active post-World War II service. On 1 July 1955 the ship was redesignated USS Daggett County (LST-689); she was struck from the Naval Vessel Register on 1 October 1959.

In 1961, she was donated to Japan and commissioned as the Maritime Self-Defense Force's Ōsumi-class tank landing ship as JDS Ōsumi (LST-4001). Transferred to the Republic of the Philippines in 1975, and named BRP Davao Oriental (LT-506). She was sold for scrapping by the Philippine Navy.
 
LST-689 earned two battle stars for World War II service.

References

See also
 List of United States Navy LSTs
  – MSDF

LST-542-class tank landing ships
Ships built in Jeffersonville, Indiana
1944 ships
World War II amphibious warfare vessels of the United States
LST-542-class tank landing ships of the Japan Maritime Self-Defense Force
LST-542-class tank landing ships of the Philippine Navy
Daggett County, Utah